Lasta (Amharic: ላስታ lāstā) is a historic district in northern Ethiopia. It is the district in which Lalibela is situated, the former capital of Ethiopia during the Zagwe dynasty and home to 11 medieval rock-hewn churches. Its original name in the Middle Ages was Begwena.

According to G.W.B. Huntingford, Lasta is first mentioned in the fourteenth century, although it obviously had been inhabited long before that. In the 18th century the Czech Franciscan Remedius Prutky listed Lasta as one of the 22 provinces of Ethiopia still subject to the Emperor, but singled Lasta out as one of the six he considered "large and truly deserving of the name of kingdom." Its neighbor to the west was Begemder, and to the north, Wag.

See also
Lasta (woreda), the present district of the same name
Wagshum

References 

Provinces of Ethiopia